Sutherland railway station is located on the Illawarra line, serving the Sydney suburb of Sutherland. It is served by Sydney Trains T4 line services and NSW TrainLink South Coast line services.

History

Sutherland station opened on 26 December 1885 as the interim terminus of the Illawarra line when it was extended from Hurstville. The station opened for general rail traffic on 1 March 1886. It consisted of a brick station facing both the road and railway, a goods shed, and a stationmaster's residence. On 9 March 1886, the line was extended to Waterfall.

On 16 December 1939, Sutherland became a junction station with the opening of the Cronulla line. Although the electric wires continued south to Loftus and Royal National Park, until this was extended to Waterfall in 1980, Sutherland was the transfer station for services to Wollongong.

Upgrades
On 15 November 1993, an upgraded footbridge with a new ticket office and lifts was opened by Minister for Transport Bruce Baird.

A number of upgrades have taken place. In 2010, as part of the CityRail Clearways Program, the junction to the south of the station leading to the Cronulla railway line was duplicated.

A new bus interchange was completed in May 2014. A new lift to Platform 1 was completed in October 2014 making the station fully wheelchair accessible.

In August 2014, construction commenced on a new 340 vehicle multi-storey car park. It opened on 6 July 2015.

In 2018, the lift from platforms 2 and 3 was rebuilt to have the entrance from the north end instead of the south.

Platforms & services

Transport links
Transdev NSW operates eight routes via Sutherland station – all routes depart from the bus interchange on the western side of the station except routes 969 and 976, which depart from Flora Street on the eastern side:
961: Westfield Miranda to Barden Ridge
962: Westfield Miranda to 
965: to Woronora
969: to Cronulla
976: to Grays Point
991: to Heathcote
993: Westfield Miranda to Engadine & Woronora Heights
M92: to Parramatta station

Sutherland station is served by one NightRide route:
NightRide N10: to Town Hall station

Trackplan

References

External links

Sutherland station details Transport for New South Wales
Sutherland Station Public Transport Map Transport for NSW

Easy Access railway stations in Sydney
Railway stations in Sydney
Railway stations in Australia opened in 1885
Illawarra railway line
Cronulla railway line
Sutherland Shire